The Prince of Wales is the title traditionally given to the heir apparent to the reigning monarch of the United Kingdom, although the title is not automatic.

Prince of Wales may also refer to:

Places
 Prince of Wales Island (disambiguation)

Australia 
 Prince of Wales Island (Queensland), an island in the Torres Strait
 Prince Of Wales, Queensland, the locality on the island in the Shire of Torres

Canada 
Prince of Wales, New Brunswick, a rural community
Prince of Wales Strait, Northwest Territories
Prince of Wales Mountains, a mountain range on Ellesmere Island, Nunavut
Prince of Wales Range, mountain range on Vancouver Island, British Columbia

United States 
Cape Prince of Wales, the westernmost point of the North American mainland

Railway locomotives 
 Vale of Rheidol Railway locomotive Prince of Wales
 GCR Class 11F (Improved Director Class) locomotive Prince of Wales
 LNWR Prince of Wales Class, a class of express passenger steam locomotive first built in 1911
 London, Brighton and South Coast Railway no. 46 Prince of Wales, an LB&SCR B4 class 4-4-0 tender locomotive named after George V
 LNER P2 Class 2007 Prince of Wales, a steam locomotive

Schools
 Prince of Wales Secondary School in Vancouver, British Columbia, Canada
 Prince of Wales Public School (Barrie), a public school in Barrie, Ontario
 Prince of Wales Public School (Belleville), a public school in Belleville, Ontario
 Prince of Wales Public School (Brockville), a public school in Brockville, Ontario
 Prince of Wales Public School (Peterborough), a public school in Peterborough, Ontario
 Prince of Wales, a school in Hamilton, Ontario
 His Royal Highness The Prince of Wales Institute of Engineering and Technology, a technical institute in Jorhat, India

Ships
 , several ships of the Royal Navy
 , several ships that served the East India Company
 HM Packet Ship Prince of Wales, one of two troop ships that sank in Dublin Bay in 1807 with the loss of 400
 , a paddle steamer in service 1886–1896
 , 1842, see New Zealand Company ships
 , operated by the Hudson's Bay Company (HBC) from 1793 to 1841, see Hudson's Bay Company vessels
 , operated by the HBC from 1845 to 1850, see Hudson's Bay Company vessels
 , operated by the HBC from 1850 to 1885, see Hudson's Bay Company vessels

In sports
 Prince of Wales Conference, former name of the National Hockey League's Eastern Conference (NHL)
 Prince of Wales Trophy, an award presented by the National Hockey League to the Eastern Conference playoff champions
 Prince of Wales Trophy (polo), awarded at Royal County of Berkshire Polo Club 
 Prince of Wales Trophy, motorcycle speedway event held in Newport, Wales
 Prince of Wales F.C., a former football club in Gibraltar

Theatres 
 Prince of Wales Theatre, former West End theatre in Coventry Street, London
 Prince of Wales' Theatre, former name for the Scala Theatre on Charlotte Street, Camden
 Prince of Wales Theatre, Cardiff, a former theatre
 Prince of Wales Theatre, Adelaide, became Her Majesty's Theatre
 Prince of Wales Theatre, Hobart, demolished 1987
 Prince of Wales Theatre, Melbourne (1862–1864)

 Prince of Wales Theatre, Sydney, destroyed by fire twice, became a Theatre Royal

Other
 Prince of Wales Blockhouse, Devil's Peak, Cape Town, South Africa
 Prince of Wales Bridge (Canada), between Ottawa, Ontario, and Gatineau, Quebec, Canada
 Prince of Wales Bridge (United Kingdom), between England and Wales
 Prince of Wales Fort, a historic fort at Churchill, Manitoba, Canada
 Prince of Wales Hospice and Prince of Wales Colliery, Pontefract, England
 Prince of Wales Hospital (disambiguation)
 Prince of Wales Hotel, Alberta, Canada
 Prince of Wales Museum, the former name of Chhatrapati Shivaji Maharaj Vastu Sangrahalaya, Mumbai, India
 Prince of Wales tea blend
 Prince of Wales (cocktail), named after and invented by Edward VII
 Prince of Wales, a nickname for Richie Burnett (born 1967), Welsh darts player
Prince of Wales check pattern, a variant of Glen Plaid Pattern.

See also
 Princess of Wales